YWAM Liberty is the former LAstrolabe, a French icebreaking research vessel which was used to supply the Dumont d'Urville research station in Antarctica.

The vessel made regular voyages between Hobart and the Dumont D'Urville research station for fifteen years and was replaced by a new icebreaker bearing the same name in 2017.

History

1992 Northeast Passage
The vessel has also traversed the Northeast passage.
The European Space Agency reports a 1992 traverse "was the first civilian expedition through the NSR since the Russian revolution." LAstrolabe was escorted on her transit by Russian icebreakers.

2013 Antarctic Ocean rescue mission
LAstrolabe attempted to reach Akademik Shokalskiy, trapped by an outbreak of old glacial ice in the Antarctic Ocean. LAstrolabe didn't match Chinese research vessel Xuě Lóngs  from the trapped Russian ship, but got closer than the Australian Aurora Australis' . Withdrawing after encountering heavy ice, she subsequently supported further attempts by Xuě Lóng and Aurora Australis to reach Akademik Shokalskiy and rescue her passengers.

2018 Deployment to Bougainville PNG as a Medical Ship 
From July 2018 YWAM Liberty spent six months in Bougainville, Papua New Guinea providing primary health, dental, optometry and ophthalmic care. The ship is administered by YWAM Ships Kona, from Kailua-Kona in Hawaii.

Incidents

2005 man overboard incident

On January 27, 2005, a crew member was found to have gone overboard.
The missing crew member's body was found.

During the recovery of his body the second engineer's hand was seriously injured, and he was at risk of losing his thumb.
A report by the Australian Transport Safety Board concluded his injury would have been avoided if the block he was using to recover the ship's boat had been equipped with hand holds. The report noted that the deceased crew member was found with a high blood alcohol level. He had been seen to be depressed, prior to his death, and the report concluded he had jumped or fallen overboard under the influence of alcohol.

2010 Antarctica helicopter crash

On October 28, 2010, a Eurocopter AS350 helicopter which operated between the ship and the Dumont d'Urville Station crashed in bad weather en route to the station. All 4 on board were killed.

References

External links

 French Polar Institute
 Shiprepair.com
 University of New South Wales

1986 ships